Book Revue is a 1946 Warner Bros. Looney Tunes cartoon directed by Bob Clampett. The cartoon was released on January 5, 1946, and features Daffy Duck.

The plotline is a mixture of the plots of Frank Tashlin's Speaking of the Weather (1937), Have You Got Any Castles? (1938) and Clampett's own A Coy Decoy (1941).

Plot

The cartoon starts out in the same, pastoral "after midnight at a closed bookstore" fashion of Frank Tashlin's trio of "books coming to life" cartoons, to the strains of Moonlight Sonata; a colorized version of the storefront from A Coy Decoy can be seen. Inside, an inebriated "cuckoo bird" pops out of a cuckoo clock to announce the arrival of midnight (and signaling the "cuckoo" activities to follow) and the books come alive. The first of these is a book collection called "Complete Works of Shakespeare". Shakespeare is shown in silhouette while his literally-rendered insides ("works") are functioning clockwork mechanisms, along with old-fashioned "stop" and "go" traffic signals, set to the "ninety years without slumbering, tick-tock, tick-tock" portion of "My Grandfather's Clock".

Cut to a book titled Young Man with a Horn; a caricature of Harry James breaks loose with a jazz trumpet obbligato similar to James' "You Made Me Love You", in which he segues into the standard, "It Had to Be You", as a striptease is about to begin on the cover of Cherokee Strip. Book covers for The Whistler and The Sea Wolf show their characters whistling and howling at the off-screen action, Shakespeare's inner workings, when seeing the goings-on, break apart. Henry VIII (designed to resemble Charles Laughton's portrayal of him) also gets excited by the striptease until his mother on the cover of The Aldrich Family calls for him. As she starts to spank Henry, "The Voice in the Wilderness", an emaciated Frank Sinatra caricature, in a wheelchair, gently sings "It Had to Be You" while being pushed along by an orderly. Henry's mother, along with other female book cover characters (such as bobbysoxer versions of Little Women, Mother Goose and Whistler's Mother on the cover of "Famous Paintings"), begin swooning for "Frankie".

Immediately thereafter, a jam session begins featuring Harry James, Tommy Dorsey on the cover of "Brass" (who at one point rubs his trombone slide under W.C. Fields' nose), an Indian on the cover of Drums Along the Mohawk who morphs into Gene Krupa, Benny Goodman as the "Pie-Eyed Piper" (some mice yell "Yay, Benny!"), and a green Bob Burns on the cover of the Arkansas Traveler, all performing a jazz version of "It Had to Be You". Annoyed by the revelry, Daffy Duck steps out of the cover of a Looney Tunes & Merrie Melodies comic book (in the background is a book by "Ann Anonymous" titled The Invisible Man: A Biography of Robert Clampett) and starts rifling through a trunk (Saratoga Trunk) for clothes. Just after Gene plays some notes on the buttons lining the corpulent stomach of Hudson's Bay, Daffy dons a zoot suit coat, gloves and a curly, blonde hairpiece, as well as what appears to be a set of fake teeth.

Daffy orders for the music to "STOP!" and the jam session screeches to a halt. Standing in front of a book called "Danny Boy" with the classic Ukrainian tune Ochi chyornye as background music and the background becoming one with illegible newsprint superimposed on silhouettes of urban buildings, Daffy (effecting Danny Kaye's fake Russian accent) says "pooey!" to swing music and jazz. He then starts reminiscing about his "natife willage" with its "soft music", "why-o-leens" and the "happy peoples sitting on their balalaikas, playing their samowars" (misusing both terms) and also talks about a girl called Cucaracha, who he describes as "so round, so firm, so fully packed, so easy on the draw". Saying that "they would sing to him a little gypsy love song", Daffy breaks into his normal character and briefly sings "La Cucaracha" (including his "hoo-hoo" sounds). Daffy continues in his fake Russian accent as he sings Carolina In The Morning, inadvertently teasing the Big Bad Wolf, who at this point is still in the window of "Gran'Ma's House"; Daffy beats a hasty retreat to stage left. Meanwhile, Little Red Riding Hood, based on Margaret O'Brien, skips past Daffy and toward Gran'Ma's House. Realizing the danger, Daffy puts himself between Red and the door, breaking into Danny Kaye's scat singing style to warn Red about the Wolf, including mock chewing on her leg for emphasis, not noticing the Wolf adding salt to his leg. Red runs away screaming and Daffy halfway notices the Wolf before returning to his pantomime; finally he fully recognizes the danger (becoming a giant eye in a wild double take).

Daffy runs away, pursued by the wolf through Hopalong Cassidy, Uncle Tom's Cabin and the Petrified Forest. The police sergeant on the cover of the Police Gazette notices what's going on and alerts all other police officers. The Wolf ends up apprehended by the Long Arm of the Law and is placed before The Judge who declares the Wolf guilty and sentences him to Life in spite of his objections ("You can't do dis to me! I'm a citizen, see!" to the tune of "Lucia di Lammermoor"), though the Wolf makes his Escape soon after. Jimmy Durante, incongruously illustrating the cover of So Big, turns toward the Wolf, and his huge nose trips the Wolf, who goes sliding down Skid Row, nearly falling into Dante's Inferno. The Wolf scrambles to the top, but the Sinatra caricature reappears, held in the orderly's hands as if he were a doll. The Wolf, being in the grandma archetype  screams and faints, skidding head first into the inferno.

The rest of the characters, including Daffy and Red, proceed to celebrate the Wolf's death by dancing to a swing version of Carolina in the Morning (during which the background characters disappear, in an apparent continuity mistake). Suddenly, the Wolf pops out of Dante's Inferno, ending the cartoon demanding the characters "Stop that dancing up there! (as Daffy had done earlier) ... Ya sillies!" (a la Joe Besser)

Voice cast
Sara Berner as Mrs. Aldrich, Swooning Girls
Mel Blanc as Daffy Duck, Big Bad Wolf, Mice, Cop, Cuckoo Clock, Sailor
Bea Benaderet as Bobby-Soxer, Lady on "Freckles" Cover, Red
Screams provided by Bea Benaderet
The Sportsmen Quartet as Singing Group
Richard Bickenbach as Frank Sinatra
Robert C. Bruce as Henry VIII

Influence
Later releases of the short had the title card replaced with Warner Brothers' "Blue Ribbon" title card on which the title was misspelled (see above).  The original title card has since been located and the fully restored short can be seen on the Looney Tunes Golden Collection: Vol. 2 four-DVD box set, the Looney Tunes Spotlight Collection:  Vol 2 two-DVD set and on the Looney Tunes Platinum Collection: Volume 2 Blu-ray set
In 1994 it was voted #45 of the 50 Greatest Cartoons of all time by members of the animation field.
Animaniacs paid tribute to the short in an episode segment titled "Video Review" (first aired on November 23, 1993), which takes place in a video rental store and sees Yakko, Wakko, and Dot facing off against a tyrannosaurus rex who emerges from the cover of a copy of Jurassic Park, in a similar vein to Daffy squaring off against the Big Bad Wolf.
In 2015, the image of Daffy Duck in a zoot suit became an internet meme on 4chan. Posters will frequently post images of Daffy proclaiming that he is "literally them" or reply to images with sentiments such as "Where did you get this pic of me?". The image later became associated with the anime series Jojo's Bizarre Adventure due to Daffy's similarity to characters from the franchise.
In the mobile game Looney Tunes World of Mayhem, Daffy appears as Zoot Suit Daffy, with the same outfit used in the short.

Production notes
The film was reissued in 1951, as Book Review. The original title is a pun, as a revue is a variety show, while a review is an evaluation of an artwork; this pun is however not retained in the title of the reissue.

Reception
Animation historian Steve Schneider writes that many of the cartoon's references are dated, "but who cares? ... Better simply to revel in Book Revue'''s headlong brio, overlapping settings, meticulous economy of gesture, intertwining narratives, resourceful color effects, super-efficient use of screen space—and a great, great turn by a duck called Daffy, as he dances, scat-sings, cavorts, and distorts in one of his true moments of glory... Book Revue'' is an encyclopedia of what can be done in the animated medium if you're brilliant enough."

References

External links

List of the "50 Greatest Cartoons of All Time"
 Book Revue on the Internet Archive

1946 animated films
1946 short films
1946 films
Looney Tunes shorts
Warner Bros. Cartoons animated short films
Daffy Duck films
Films directed by Bob Clampett
1940s Warner Bros. animated short films
Cultural depictions of W. C. Fields
Cultural depictions of Frank Sinatra
Cultural depictions of Jimmy Durante
Animation based on real people
Films scored by Carl Stalling
Cultural depictions of Henry VIII
Films based on Little Red Riding Hood
Films set in bookstores